Robert William Ayre (26 March 1932 – 31 July 2018) was an English former professional footballer who played as a centre forward in the Football League.

References

External links

1932 births
2018 deaths
English footballers
England under-23 international footballers
Association football forwards
Charlton Athletic F.C. players
Chippenham Town F.C. players
Reading F.C. players
Weymouth F.C. players
English Football League players